The Sir Arthur McGregor Municipality is one of the 21 municipalities (municipios) that makes up the eastern Venezuelan state of Anzoátegui and, according to the 2011 census by the National Institute of Statistics of Venezuela, the municipality has a population of 9,768.  The town of El Chaparro is the shire town of the Sir Arthur McGregor Municipality.

Demographics
The Sir Arthur McGregor Municipality, according to a 2007 population estimate by the National Institute of Statistics of Venezuela, has a population of 9,434 (up from 8,590 in 2000). This amounts to 0.6% of the state's population.

Government
The mayor of the Sir Arthur McGregor Municipality is María Agustina Rondón de Salazar, re-elected November 23, 2008 with 66% of the vote. The municipality is divided into two parishes; El Chaparro and Tomás Alfaro Calatrava.

See also
El Chaparro
Anzoátegui
Municipalities of Venezuela

References

External links
sirgregory-anzoategui.gob.ve 

Municipalities of Anzoategui